Marcia Otacilia Severa was the Empress of Rome and wife of Emperor Philip the Arab, who reigned over the Roman Empire from 244 to 249.

Biography

Early life 
She was a member of the ancient gens Otacilia, of consular and senatorial rank. Her father was Otacilius Severus or Severianus, who served as Roman Governor of Macedonia and Moesia, while her mother was either a member of or related to the gens Marcia. According to sources she had a brother called Severianus, who served as Roman Governor of Lower Moesia in 246–247.

Marriage
In 234, Severa married Philip who at that time probably served in the Praetorian Guard under Emperor Alexander Severus and they had at least one child, Marcus Iulius Philippus Severus or Philippus II (born in 238), who later became co-emperor with his father.

In February 244, the emperor Gordianus died in Mesopotamia, it is suspected in the sources that he was murdered, and there is a possibility that Severa was involved in the conspiracy. Her husband Philip became the new emperor and he gave his young predecessor a proper funeral and his ashes were returned to Rome for burial.

Philip gave Severa the honorific title of Augusta and had their son made heir of the purple.

Severa and Philip are sometimes considered as the first Christian imperial couple, because during their reign the persecutions of Christians had ceased and the couple had become tolerant towards Christianity but their beliefs have not been proven. It was through her intervention, for instance, that Bishop and Saint Babylas of Antioch was saved from persecution.

In 249, the Danubian armies proclaimed Decius Augustus and in August, Philip died in battle near Verona and Decius became the sole emperor. Severa was in Rome at that time and when the news of her husband's death arrived, their son was murdered by the Praetorian Guard still in her arms. Severa survived her husband and son and lived later in obscurity.

References

Sources

Further reading
  Minaud, Gérard, Les vies de 12 femmes d’empereur romain - Devoirs, Intrigues & Voluptés , Paris, L’Harmattan, 2012, ch. 10,  La vie de Marcia Otacilia Sévéra, femme de Philippe l’Arabe, p. 243-262

3rd-century Roman empresses
Year of birth unknown
Year of death unknown
Crisis of the Third Century
Augustae
Marcii
Otacilii
Philip the Arab